Eric Hamilton Wilson (born November 24, 1940) is a Canadian author of young adult fiction.  His detective novels follow the adventures of Tom and Liz Austen, young sleuths in Canada.  Wilson has taught elementary and secondary school in White Rock, British Columbia, and has a B.A. from the University of British Columbia.

In 1990, he won the Arthur Ellis Award for Lifetime Achievement from The Crime Writers of Canada.

The Tom and Liz Austen mysteries
Originally a public school teacher, Wilson's teaching experiences pushed him into writing.  Frustrated by some of his slow learners rejecting books as being too boring, Wilson decided to try writing stories himself.  His first short stories were popular with his students, but publishers rejected his first five manuscripts.

Wilson developed a formula based on his eighth-grade students' preferences.  His books would be short, should always start with a dramatic opening scene, be dialogue heavy, and have abundant "cliffhanger" moments.  Wilson's books have similarities to the Hardy Boys adventure series, but also attempt the reader participation of "true" mysteries, such as those by Agatha Christie.

Wilson prominently features Canadian settings and their history in his novels.  He also uses topical themes, such as environmentalism, child safety, and drug abuse, to allow teachers a springboard for classroom discussion.  Criticism of Wilson's writing includes his use of improbable plotlines and somewhat stilted dialogue.

The Tom and Liz Austen books have won several Canadian book world recognitions, including the Crime Writers of Canada Chairman's Award, and the Canadian Booksellers Association's Author of the Year Award in 1993.   Wilson currently lives in Victoria, British Columbia.

Bibliography

Tom & Liz Austen Mysteries
 Murder on 'The Canadian''' - 1976
 Vancouver Nightmare - 1978
 Terror in Winnipeg - 1979
 The Lost Treasure of Casa Loma - 1980
 The Ghost of Lunenburg Manor - 1982
 Disneyland Hostage - 1982
 The Kootenay Kidnapper - 1984
 Vampires of Ottawa - 1984
 Spirit in the Rainforest - 1985
 The Green Gables Detective - 1988
 Code Red At the Supermall - 1989
 Cold Midnight in Old Quebec - 1989
 The Ice Diamond Quest - 1990
 The Prairie Dog Conspiracy - 1993
 The St. Andrews Werewolf - 1993
 The Case of the Golden Boy - 1994
 The Inuk Mountie Adventure - 1996
 Escape from Big Muddy - 1997
 The Emily Carr Mystery - 2001
 Red River Ransom - 2006

Other novels
 Summer of Discovery (1984)
 The Mask of the Raven aka The Unmasking of Ksan'' (1986)

References

External links
 Official website

1940 births
Canadian children's writers
Living people
University of British Columbia alumni
Writers from Ottawa
Writers from Victoria, British Columbia